Black Rose is the lone album by the rock band Black Rose, whose lead singer was American singer-actress Cher. The album was released on August 21, 1980, by Casablanca Records, her final project on the label. Unlike Cher's previous solo records (such as Take Me Home), the album was a commercial failure. It failed to chart and has sold only 400,000 copies worldwide.

Album information 
 In 1980, Cher and her part-time boyfriend Les Dudek wanted to form a band called Black Rose.

The band, before signing a contract with Casablanca Records, was an independent rock band that played in small clubs around Los Angeles and tried to make it without trading on Cher's celebrity. Besides Cher, the other band members were Les Dudek, Gary Ferguson, Michael Finnigan, Warren Ham, Rocket Ritchotte and Trey Thompson.

Black Rose, the last of Cher's albums released by the Casablanca Records, was produced by James Newton Howard. Her name never appeared on the album cover and Cher's face was only seen in a band photo on the back cover.

The album is Cher's first album with a rock sound, that would characterize her future Geffen-era albums. The album was a flop and Cher fans were unaware of the project. After the failure of the album, the band broke up the following year.

In Germany, Spectrum Records re-released the Black Rose album, completely intact, for the first time on a CD. It was packaged with a photo of Cher singing in concert and marketed as a Cher album, instead of as a  Black Rose album.

In August 2020, a remastered version was released on Rock Candy Records for the album's 40th anniversary. It was remastered by Jon Astley. A vinyl release on purple vinyl scheduled for the end of 2020 will include two previously unreleased songs,  "Desperado" and "I Shall Be Released."

Second untitled album 
There were rumors about a subsequent album, recorded during 1980 and 1981, which would have contained some songs sung live in their mini-tour, "The Black Rose Show", such as "Ain’t Got No Money" and "Dirty Old Man", but the project was cancelled. "Don't Trust That Woman" written by Cher and Les Dudek, was written for the album but was dumped. Dudek recorded the song for his album, and a song with the same lyrics was later recorded by Elton John.

Promotion 
The album was promoted on The Tonight Show Starring Johnny Carson and the band performed "Never Should've Started" and "Julie" but both lip-synched. 
The album was also promoted at the Midnight Special with four performances: "Never Should've Started", "Julie", "You Know It" and the Frankie Miller cover "Ain't Got No Money" all the songs were sung live. Videos of the performance have been available on YouTube since March 2009. 
The album was also promoted on The Merv Griffin Show.

The Black Rose Show 
To support the album and to lift sales in 1980, the Black Rose band and Cher did a mini tour called The Black Rose Show performed only in North America. The setlist for the show contained: "Never Should've Started", "Julie", "You Know It", "Ain't Got No Money", a little band introduction, and "Dirty Old Man". For six East Coast concert dates, Black Rose was the opening act for Hall & Oates. The costumes for the show were designed by Bob Mackie. The band performed in Pennsylvania, Central Park, Garden State Arts Center in Holmdel Township and elsewhere.

Set list
 "Intro"
 "Never Should Have Started"
 "Julie"
 "Take it from the Boys"
 "88 Degrees"
 "Déjà Vu (Da Voodoo's In You)"
 "Fast Company"
 "Ain't Got No Money"

Source:

Shows

Critical reception 

The reviews were mixed, many critics questioning Cher's credibility and drawing comparisons to other New Wave rock groups, particularly Blondie. 
Billboard magazine said that "[...] it shapes a New Wave style that fits the midtempo rock mode with which the main group members are associated" and about Cher "especially well done though Cher's vocals are emotional and full of life on the entire disk".
People magazine said that "Cher's quivering, over-mannered vocals on this LP need all the help they can get, and she gets more than she deserves" and "This album could be vastly improved, rerecorded by the Group with No Singer".

Track listing

Personnel 

 Cher - lead vocals
 Les Dudek - guitars, vocals
 Ron "Rocket" Ritchotte - guitars, background vocals
 Phil Brown - additional guitar on "88 Degrees"
 Mike Finnigan - keyboards, background vocals
 James Newton Howard - record producer, synthesizer, keyboards
 Michael Boddicker - synthesizer, keyboards
 Steve Porcaro - synthesizer, keyboards
 David Paich - keyboards, background vocals
 Trey Thompson - bass
 Gary Ferguson - drums
 Max Gronenthal - background vocals
 Warren Ham - background vocals

 John Townsend - background vocals
 Anne Streer - production coordinator
 Mick Mizausky - engineer
 Tom Knox - engineer
 Dana Latham - engineer
 Bob Schaper - engineer
 Skip Sailor - engineer assistance
 Gene Meros - engineer assistance
 Terry Christian - engineer assistance
 Bill Schnee - mixing
 Mike Reese - mastering
 Kosh - art direction, design
 Aaron Rapoport - photography

References

External links 
 Official website of Cher

1980 debut albums
Cher albums
Casablanca Records albums
Articles containing video clips